Becca di Nona is a peak in the Graian Alps of the Aosta Valley in north-western Italy. Together with Monte Emilius, it is one of the main mountains visible from Aosta looking southwards.

History 
This mountain was known in the past as Pic de douze heures, that is to say "12 p.m. peak" in French, as the sun stands right on top of it at noon.

In 1857, the Aostan doctor Laurent Cerise nominated it Pic Carrel, to dedicate it to Valdotainian prior Georges Carrel, but his proposal was not accepted.

The hagiography of St Anselm written by his chaplain Eadmer records that, when he was a child, he had a mystical vision of God and his court on the mountain.

Sports 
At the top is a cast iron statue of St. Mary. Every year a running race, the Becca di Nona Skyrace or Skyrace Ville d'Aoste, is organized starting from Émile Chanoux square in Aosta, arriving to the peak and returning to the city.

References

Citations

Bibliography
 

Mountains of the Alps
Alpine three-thousanders
Mountains of Aosta Valley